William Alfred Hawley MacBrien (February 22, 1883 – March 24, 1972) was vice president and later Board Chairman of the NHL's  Toronto Maple Leafs for much of the 1940s and 1950s. He won 7 Stanley Cups with the team in 1932, 1942, 1945,  1947, 1948, 1949, and 1951. He died in 1972.

References

External links
Picture of W. A. H. MacBrien's Name on the 1942 Stanley Cup Plaque
Picture of W. A. H. MacBrien's Name on the 1945 Stanley Cup Plaque
Picture of W. A. H. MacBrien's Name on the 1948 Stanley Cup Plaque
Picture of W. A. H. MacBrien's Name on the 1949 Stanley Cup Plaque
Picture of W. A. H. MacBrien's Name on the 1951 Stanley Cup Plaque

National Hockey League executives
Toronto Maple Leafs executives
1883 births
1972 deaths